Thank You, Mr. Moto is a 1937 film directed by Norman Foster. It is the second in a series of eight films starring Peter Lorre as Mr. Moto. It was based on the novel of the same name by the detective's creator, John P. Marquand. Mr. Moto battles murderous treasure hunters for priceless ancient scrolls which reveal the location of the long-lost tomb of Genghis Khan.

Plot
A caravan settles for the night in the Gobi Desert. A man sneaks into a tent to steal a scroll, but adventurer and soldier of fortune Kentaro Moto (Peter Lorre) is only pretending to be asleep and kills him. When the caravan reaches Peiping, Moto is searched by the police. The scroll is found, but Moto grabs it and escapes.

He changes clothes and accepts an invitation to a party hosted by Colonel Tchernov (Sig Rumann) in honor of American Eleanor Joyce (Jayne Regan). At the soirée, Moto observes a guest, Prince Chung (Philip Ahn) leaving his mother to speak privately with Tchernov in another room. Tchernov offers to buy certain family heirloom scrolls from Chung. When Chung refuses to part with them, Tchernov draws a pistol but is killed (off-screen) by Moto. Joyce stumbles upon the scene and watches Moto stages the death to look like a suicide.

Later, as a favour to his rescuer, Chung grants Moto's request to see the scrolls. Chung informs him that the seven scrolls give directions to the lost grave of Genghis Khan and his treasure. However, one scroll was lent to an exhibition and was stolen.

A dealer in antiquities, Pereira (John Carradine), shows Joyce some wares. She is interested in a (fake) scroll, but the price is too high. While shopping the next day with diplomat Tom Nelson (Thomas Beck), they see Moto entering Pereira's shop. Moto gets Pereira to confess that he stole the authentic scroll, but before he can obtain more information, Pereira is shot and killed by a gunman in a car which speeds away.

Moto returns to his apartment to find it ransacked. Sensing that the intruder is still present, Moto leaves his gun lying around. Schneider (Wilhelm von Brincken) holds him at gunpoint and forces Moto to give him the scroll. When Moto tries to flee, Schneider shoots him with Moto's own gun. However, the gun was filled with blanks and Moto trails Schneider to Madame Tchernov (Nedda Harrigan). When they leave to rendezvous with their gang, Moto starts to follow, but is knocked out by the butler, Ivan (John Bleifer). Joyce, who had been comforting the widow, is taken hostage.

The arch-villain (and Madame Tchernov's lover), Herr Koerger (Sidney Blackmer), forces Prince Chung to reveal the location of the scrolls by striking his mother. As they are leaving, Madame Chung attacks Koerger with a knife and is killed. Meanwhile, Nelson finds and revives Moto. They rush to help Prince Chung, but arrive too late and, feeling dishonored, the Prince commits suicide after they untie him; Moto comforts him before he dies by promising to avenge the Chung family and safeguard the tomb.

The two men track the criminals to a junk. After another attempt to kill him, Moto informs Koerger that the scroll he gave Schneider is a fake. He offers to split Genghis Khan's treasure. Then he sows dissent by telling Madame Tchernov that Koerger is actually in love with Joyce, which the quick-thinking American "confirms". This provides a distraction for Moto to kill Koerger. Then, to the dismay of Joyce and Nelson, Moto burns the scrolls to fulfill his promise to Chung.

Cast

 Peter Lorre as Mr. Kentaro Moto
 Thomas Beck as Tom Nelson
 Pauline Frederick as Madame Chung
 Jayne Regan as Eleanor Joyce
 Sidney Blackmer as Herr Koerger
 Sig Rumann as Colonel Tchernov
 John Carradine as Pereira
 Wilhelm von Brincken as Schneider (as William Von Brincken)
 Nedda Harrigan as Madame Tchernov
 Philip Ahn as Prince Chung
 John Bleifer as Ivan

Production
Thank You, Mr Moto was the second Mr Moto novel following No Exit and was published in 1936 after having been serialised first. The New York Times praised the book's "vitality and vividness".

In June 1937 Fox said the first three movies in the series would be Think Fast, Mr Moto, Thank You Mr Moto and Mr Moto's Gamble. Think Fast had been filmed in February. The second Moto film actually shot was Look Out Mr Moto (which became Mr. Moto Takes a Chance) filmed in July but it would not come out until after the other three films.

Jayne Regan was given her first lead when cast in the film.

Shooting
Filming started October 1937 and went through to November.

The film marked the last appearance of screen great Pauline Frederick.

By now the films were so popular that in December 1937 Fox refused Lorre a leave of absence to appear on Broadway in Wine of Choice with Miriam Hopkins.

In December 1937 the Alfred Cohn story Death at the Artist's Ball was purchased by Fox as a Moto story.

Reception
The film was released in December 1937. The Christian Science Monitor called it "well made and fairly exciting."

Home media
This film, along with Think Fast, Mr. Moto, Mr. Moto Takes a Chance and Mysterious Mr. Moto, was released on DVD in 2006 by 20th Century Fox as part of The Mr. Moto Collection, Volume One.

See also
Think Fast, Mr. Moto 
Mr. Moto's Gamble 
Mr. Moto Takes a Chance 
Mysterious Mr. Moto
Mr. Moto's Last Warning 
Mr. Moto in Danger Island
Mr. Moto Takes a Vacation
The Return of Mr. Moto

References

External links

 
 
 
 

1937 films
American black-and-white films
Films based on American novels
Films directed by Norman Foster
American mystery films
Films set in Mongolia
20th Century Fox films
Films produced by Sol M. Wurtzel
1937 mystery films
Films scored by Samuel Kaylin
1930s American films
1930s English-language films